BackBerner was an Australian political satire sketch comedy television series, broadcast on and produced by ABC TV with Crackerjack Productions. The program was hosted by stand-up comic Peter Berner and noted Australian character actor Louise Siversen. The series aired from  19 August 1999 to 14 November 2002.

The show parodied the current affairs format with Berner, but most frequently Siversen engaged in interviews with various representatives and authorities on the subjects of that week's news stories to discuss the issue, with various comedians playing the role of the interviewees. The most common of these characters were Dr Dennis Johnson who covered medical issues and Dexter Pinion, the far-right conservative correspondent for government reconciliation who frequently railed against the supposedly left-leaning "AB-friggin'-C". Numerous other character actors often made return appearances under different names, such as Nicholas Hammond who often appeared as Jack Bloom, a representative for the US Government.

The music played during the opening and closing credits is an excerpt from TISM's song "Thunderbirds are Coming Out".

Other regulars on the program were Tanya Bulmer and Kym Gyngell who engaged in pre-recorded external and on-the-street interviews.

The show was axed in 2002, and poked a last jab by explaining that Dexter Pinion had in fact finally taken control of the "AB-friggin'-C" and shut Berner down.

External links 
 
 

Australian Broadcasting Corporation original programming
Australian television sketch shows
Australian satirical television shows
1999 Australian television series debuts
2002 Australian television series endings
1990s Australian comedy television series
2000s Australian comedy television series